Meadowridge is a suburb in the southern suburbs of Cape Town, South Africa. It is the second garden city in Cape Town and was officially opened on 23 March 1955.

Local shopping centres are Meadowridge Park 'n Shop and Meadowridge Shopping Centre (the first shopping centre). Nearby schools are Bergvliet Primary School, Sweet Valley Primary School and Bergvliet High School. Close by is the local football club, Meadowridge AFC.

Meadowridge is home to the Meadowridge Library, one of Cape Town's top circulating libraries, which serves Meadowridge and surrounding neighborhoods.

The Meadowridge Sports Association, chaired for many years by Guy Taylor is the custodian of the football fields, the forest and the building currently occupied by the Sunny Skies nursery school.

Meadowridge resident testimony...
Over the last 10 years the football field was closed in with fencing to prevent the local community from damaging the football ground for the odd match to be played irregularly. Older residents would remember the site as a place to visit and have fun with their children but the high fences now make it seem like a protected fortress.

References

 
Suburbs of Cape Town